"Nikle Currant" is a Punjabi song written by Jaani and sung by Neha Kakkar and Jassi Gill. The song is directed by Arvind Khaira and music given by Sukh-E.

Music video
The music video titled "Nikle Currant" was released by T-Series on YouTube. It has received 10 million views on YouTube in 24 hours. As of April 2019 video has over 450 million views on YouTube. As of November 2020 the video has over 800 million views on YouTube . It is one of the fastest Punjabi songs to cross 204 million views on YouTube.

Background
The song title "Nikle Currant" which means "Electric Shock Comes Out", the video is about Jassi Gill proposing Neha Kakkar.

Reception 
The song was Chartbuster as it was Trending worldwide at position 4 on YouTube Billboard charts for 8 weeks.

Charts

References 

Bhangra (music) songs
Punjabi-language songs
2018 songs
Neha Kakkar songs
T-Series (company) singles